The Meet al-Attar shooting was a mass shooting that occurred in Meet al-Attar a village near Banha, Egypt on 21 August 2013, when Omar Abdul Razeq Abdullah Rifai, a 28-year-old unemployed poultry dealer and ex-convict who was recently released from his sentence after his involvement in the death of 23 people in 2008 over a family feud, fatally shot 15 people and possibly wounded several others, using an AKMS assault rifle, before being shot dead by villagers himself. In total, he has killed 38 people in a span of 5 years.

Perpetrator
Omar Abdul Razeq Abdullah Rifai (1985 – 21 August 2013) was a resident of Meet al-Attar and an ex-convict. In 2008, was found guilty of involvement in a local vendetta in which 23 people were killed. He was recently released from prison after serving his term. His motive for the attack seems to be because they failed to support his family in a vendetta.

Victims
Ahmed Samir Ibrahim Abdel Raouf, 25, shot in the chest and left side,
Abdel Aziz Abdel Fattah Abdel Aziz, 42, shot in the chest and arms,
Emad Hamdy Fathy Ali Allam, 23, shot in the abdomen,
Emad Husseiny Abdel-Hafiz Hanafi, 29, shot in the abdomen,
Mohammed Shehta Sayed Hassan, 29, shot in the abdomen and right side,
Abdullah Zenhom Afifi Metwali, 25, shot in the neck and chest,
Amin Ali Amin Al-Daedae, 33, shot in the chest,
Taha Ahmed Taha Ahmed Sayed, 25, shot in the chest and groin,
Ibrahim Sayed Ibrahim Nada, 32, shot in the head, abdomen, and left thigh,
Hassan Abdel Alim Mohamed Hassan, 41, shot in the abdomen and pelvis,
Hassan Mohammed Hadi Abdul Hafeez, 27, shot in the head and left arm,
Abdel Fattah Mohamed Faraj Ibrahim, 25, shot in the neck and right side,
Mohammed Hashim Ibrahim Hashim, 31, shot in the chest, right side, and right arm,
Mohamed Mahmoud Abdel Rahim Sayed, 25, shot in the back and right arm,
Ahmed Abdul Azim Sayed Abdul Sadiq, 27, shot in the back,

References

External links
Egypt: Man kills 17 people in shooting spree, Gulfnews.com (21 August 2013)
Man kills 15 in reported vengeful shooting spree in Banha, Al-Ahram Weekly (21 August 2013)
أمن القليوبية ينفى قتل مرتكب مجزرة ميت العطار برصاص الشرطة, Al-Ahram Weekly (21 August 2013)
وسائل إعلام: مقتل 12 شخصا في إطلاق نار عشوائي بقرية مصرية, Reuters.com (21 August 2013)
استنفار أمني بقرية "ميت العطار" بالقليوبية, almesryoon.com (21 August 2013)
"بوابة الأهرام" تنشر أسماء ضحايا مجزرة قرية ميت العطار في بنها, Al-Ahram Weekly (21 August 2013)

Attacks in Egypt in 2013
Mass murder in Egypt
Deaths by firearm in Egypt
Mass murder in 2013
Mass shootings in Egypt
Qalyubiyya Governorate
August 2013 crimes in Africa
2013 murders in Egypt
2013 mass shootings in Africa